The Kleiner Wurzelnberg hill rises to a height of  in the Harz mountains of Germany, 3.7 km northeast of Sieber in the district of Göttingen in Lower Saxony. It forms a rounded summit (Kuppe) on one of the ridges running south of the Acker which acts as the watershed between the Verlorene Kulmke and the Kleine Kulmke. The Großer Wurzelnberg is located 750 metres further east on the other side of the valley of the Kleine Kulmke.

Sources 
Topographische Karte 1:25000, Nr. 4228 Riefensbeek

Hills of Lower Saxony
Hills of the Harz
Göttingen (district)